A full court (less formally, full bench) is a court of law sitting with a greater than normal number of judges. For a court which is usually presided over by one judge, a full court has three or more judges; for a court which, like many appellate courts, normally sits as a bench of three judges, a full court has a bench of five (or more) judges.

The expression originated in England but seems largely to have fallen into disuse there, and instead the technical term "divisional court" is used when referring to a multi-judge panel in the High Court of England and Wales. 

However, the term is still used in Scotland, such as in the Court of Criminal Appeal, and in many other Commonwealth jurisdictions, such as Australia, New Zealand, South Africa, India, Pakistan, etc. Although possible, a full court typically does not involve the participation of all the judges of the court, a practice known in the United States as the court sitting en banc. An example of an exception, where the participation of all the appointed judges is the usual composition for main hearings, is the High Court of Australia.

The term reflects the practice, before permanent appeal courts were established, of appeals from decisions of trial courts being heard by several judges of the same court (usually excluding the judge who handed down the original decision). Technically, a judgment of a full court is at the same level of the judicial hierarchy as the decision appealed from and may, depending on how the doctrine of precedent applies to that particular court, not bind future courts at that level. However, the greater number of judges involved, and the fact that it is an appeal, may make it almost as persuasive, in practice, as a judgment of the same number of judges in a higher court. 

The historical trend to create separate courts of appeal, with permanent rather than ad hoc appellate judges, has reduced the need for the use of full courts. However, they are still sometimes found in cases of great significance for which there is no possibility or likelihood of a further appeal.

Notes

References

See also
Judicial panel

Courts by type